This is a list of lakes of Ontario beginning with the letter C.

Ca
Cab Lake
Caba Lake
Cabin Lake (Raimbault Township, Algoma District)
Cabin Lake (Rawlinson Creek, Kenora District)
Cabin Lake (Joynt Township, Thunder Bay District)
Cabin Lake (Sturgeon River, Kenora District)
Cabin Lake (Kawartha Lakes)
Cabin Lake (Lurch River, Thunder Bay District)
Cabin Lake (Cochrane District)
Cabin Lake (St. Ignace Island, Thunder Bay District)
Cabin Lake (Wawa)
Cable Lake (Thunder Bay District)
Cable Lake (Kenora District)
Caboose Lake
Cabot Lake
Cache Lake (Sudbury District)
Cache Lake (Rainy River District)
Cache Lake (Lecours Township, Thunder Bay District)
Cache Lake (Canisbay Township, Nipissing District)
Cache Lake (West Nipissing)
Cache Lake (Kenora District)
Cache Lake (Lookout River, Thunder Bay District)
Cache Lake (McLeod Lake, Thunder Bay District)
Cachege Lake
Cadawaja Lake
Cadden Lake (Parry Sound District)
Cadden Lake (Sudbury District)
Caddy Lake
Cadman Lake
Cadre Lake
Caesar Lake
Cahill Lake
Caibaiosai Lake
Cain Lake (Caribou River, Rainy River District)
Cain Lake (Oriana Lake, Rainy River District)
Cain Lake (Muskoka District)
Cairn Lake
Cairngorm Lake
Cairo Lake
Caithness Lake
Cal Lake
Calabogie Lake
Calais Lake
Calamity Lake
Calbeck Lake
Calcite Lake (Thunder Bay District)
Calcite Lake (Timiskaming District)
Calder Lake (Rainy River District)
Calder Lake (Kenora District)
Caldwell Lake (Rainy River District)
Caldwell Lake (Thunder Bay District)
Caldwell Lake (Lanark County)
Caledon Lake
Caley Lake
Calf Lake (Sudbury District)
Calf Lake (Kenora District)
Calhoun Lake
Caliper Lake
Call Lake
Calladine Lake
Callaghan Lake (Renfrew County)
Callaghan Lake (Rainy River District)
Callahan Lake
Callery Lake
Callinan Lake
Calm Lake (Rainy River District)
Calm Lake (Nipissing District)
Calong Lake
Calpin Lake
Calstock Lake
Calumet Lake
Calverley's Pond
Calvert Lake (Kenora District)
Calvert Lake (Thunder Bay District)
Calvert Lake (Cochrane District)
Calvin Lake
Cam Lake (Kenora District)
Cam Lake (Sudbury District)
Camden Lake
Camel Lake (Frontenac County)
Camel Lake (Muskoka District)
Camel Lake (Sudbury District)
Camel Lake (Thunder Bay District)
Camel Lake (Rainy River District)
Camel Read Lake
Camelot Lake
Cameo Lake
Cameron Lake (Brudenell, Lyndoch and Raglan)
Cameron Lake (Algoma District)
Cameron Lake (Cameron Creek, Thunder Bay District)
Cameron Lake (Cameron Creek, Kenora District)
Cameron Lake (Sproule Township, Nipissing District)
Cameron Lake (Umbach Township, Kenora District)
Cameron Lake (Kawartha Lakes)
Cameron Lake (Greater Sudbury)
Cameron Lake (Eagle River, Thunder Bay District)
Cameron Lake (Greater Madawaska)
Cameron Lake (Nairn and Hyman)
Cameron Lake (West Nipissing)
Cameron Lake (Hardwick Township, Thunder Bay District)
Cameron Lake (Bruce County)
Camerons Lake
Cameroon Lake
Cammack Lake
Camp 14 Lake
Camp 36 Lake
Camp Eleven Lake
Camp Five Lake
Camp Forty One Lake
Camp Four Lake
Camp Island Lake
Camp Lake (Tagouche Creek, Thunder Bay District)
Camp Lake (Gour Township, Kenora District)
Camp Lake (Creelman Township, Sudbury District)
Camp Lake (Greater Sudbury)
Camp Lake (Muskoka District)
Camp Lake (Haliburton County)
Camp Lake (Hasson Lake, Thunder Bay District)
Camp Lake (The North Shore)
Camp Lake (Frechette Township, Sudbury District)
Camp Lake (Haycock Township, Kenora District)
Camp Lake (Huffman Township, Sudbury District)
Camp Lake (Timmins)
Camp Lake (Elliot Lake)
Camp Lake (Houtari Township, Algoma District)
Camp Lake (Munro Township, Cochrane District)
Camp Lake (Frontenac County)
Camp Lake (Kashabowie River, Thunder Bay District)
Camp Lake (Nipissing District)
Camp Lake (Shelley Township, Sudbury District)
Camp Lake (Ivanhoe Township, Sudbury District)
Camp Nine Lake (Nipissing District)
Camp Nine Lake (Sudbury District)
Camp One Lake
Camp Seven Lake
Camp Six Lake
Camp Ten Lake
Camp Three Lake
Camp Two Lake (Sudbury District)
Camp Two Lake (Rainy River District)
Campbell Lake (Sanborn Township, Cochrane District)
Campbell Lake (Nipissing District)
Campbell Lake (St.-Charles)
Campbell Lake (Rainy River District)
Campbell Lake (Parry Sound District)
Campbell Lake (Deans Township, Sudbury District)
Campbell Lake (Clifford Township, Cochrane District)
Campbell Lake (Halliday Township, Sudbury District)
Campbell Lake (Lennox and Addington County)
Campbell Lake (Campbell Creek, Thunder Bay District)
Campbell Lake (Stover Township, Sudbury District)
Campbell Lake (Goodfellow Township, Thunder Bay District)
Campbellville Pond
Campcot Lake (Thunder Bay District)
Campcot Lake (Haliburton County)
Camper Lake
Campfire Lake (Kenora District)
Campfire Lake (Thunder Bay District)
Campground Lake
Camphouse Lake
Camping Lake
Campover Lake
Camproad Lake
Campstool Lake
Camptwo Lake
Campus Lake
Camrose Lake
Can Lake
Can Opener Lake
Canada Jay Lake
Canadensis Lake
Canal Lake (Kawartha Lakes)
Canal Lake (Rainy River District)
Canard Lake
Canary Lake
Cancer Lake
Candide Lake
Candle Lake
Candler Lake
Candybar Lake
Cane Lake
Canis Lake
Canisbay Lake
Canister Lake
Canna Lake
Cannibal Lake
Canniff Lake
Canning Lake (Parry Sound District)
Canning Lake (Haliburton County)
Cannon Lake (Porcus Lake, Kenora District)
Cannon Lake (Gitche River, Kenora District)
Cannon Lake (Hastings County)
Cannon Lake (Thunder Bay District)
Canoe Lake (Barnard Creek), in northwest Thunder Bay District
Canoe Lake (The North Shore), in Algoma District
Canoe Lake (Greater Madawaska), in Renfrew County
Canoe Lake (Parry Sound District)
Canoe Lake (Kenora District)
Canoe Lake (Frontenac County)
Canoe Lake (Sudbury District)
Canoe Lake (Lennox and Addington County)
Canoe Lake (Timiskaming District)
Canoe Lake (Scarfe Township), in Algoma District
Canoe Lake (Nipissing District)
Canoe Lake (Madawaska Valley), in Renfrew County
Canoe Lake (Syine Township), in geographic Syine Township, Thunder Bay District
Canoeshed Lake
Canon Lake (Tamarack Lake, Thunder Bay District)
Canon Lake (GTP Block 7 Township, Thunder Bay District)
Canonto Lake
Canterbury Lake
Canthook Lake (Hoey Township, Sudbury District)
Canthook Lake (Ellis Township, Sudbury District)
Canthook Lake (Thunder Bay District)
Cantin Lake (Algoma District)
Cantin Lake (Cochrane District)
Cantin Lake (Parry Sound District)
Cantley Lake
Canton Lake
Cantrill Lake
Canty Lake
Canvasback Lake
Canyon Lake (Kenora District)
Canyon Lake (Sudbury District)
Canyon Lake (Timiskaming District)
Canyon Lake (Rainy River District)
Canyon Lake (Algoma District)
Cap Lake (Sudbury District)
Cap Lake (Nipissing District)
Capee Lake
Capella Lake
Capin Lake
Capper Lake
Capre Lake
Capricornus Lake
Capsell Lake
Captain Lake
Captain Tom Lake
Captains Lake
Capton Lake
Caput Lake
Car Lake (Rainy River District)
Car Lake (Timiskaming District)
Car Lake (Kenora District)
Carafel Lake
Caragana Lake
Caramat Lake
Carcajou Lake
Carcass Lake
Card Lake (Hastings County)
Card Lake (Kenora District)
Carder Lake
Cardiff Lake
Cardinal Lake
Cardinalis Lake
Cards Lake
Cardwell Lake
Carew Lake
Carey Lake
Carfrae Lake
Cargill Lake
Cargill Mill Pond
Cariad Lake
Carib Lake
Cariboo Lake
Caribou Lake (Smellie Township, Kenora District)
Caribou Lake (Plummer Additional)
Caribou Lake (Cache Creek, Kenora District)
Caribou Lake (Juillette Township, Blind River)
Caribou Lake (Cochrane District)
Caribou Lake (Willow River, Thunder Bay District)
Caribou Lake (North Bay)
Caribou Lake (Bent Creek, Kenora District)
Caribou Lake (Pickerel Lake, Kenora District)
Caribou Lake (Timmermans Township, Blind River)
Caribou Lake (Boys Township, Kenora District)
Caribou Lake (Lehman Township, Algoma District)
Caribou Lake (Shuniah)
Caribou Lake (Abraham Township, Algoma District)
Caribou Lake (Sudbury District)
Caribou Lake (Caribou River, Thunder Bay District)
Caribou Lake (Simpson Island, Thunder Bay District)
Caribou Lake (Temagami)
Caribou Lake (Duncan Township, Algoma District)
Caribou Throat Lake
Caribus Lake
Carillon Lake
Carkner Lake
Carl Lake (Algoma District)
Carl Lake (Sudbury District)
Carl Lake (Brothers Township, Thunder Bay District)
Carl Lake (Kawashkagama River, Thunder Bay District)
Carl Wilson Lake
Carlbom Lake
Carleton Lake
Carling Lake (Kenora District)
Carling Lake (Cochrane District)
Carlisle Pond
Carlo Lake
Carlotta Lake
Carlson Lake (Cochrane District)
Carlson Lake (Thunder Bay District)
Carlton Lake
Carlyle Lake (Cochrane District)
Carlyle Lake (Sudbury District)
Carman Lake (Cochrane District)
Carman Lake (Algoma District)
Carmen Lake (Parry Sound District)
Carmen Lake (Sudbury District)
Carmen Lake (Timiskaming District)
Carmichael Lake (Kenora District)
Carmichael Lake (Cochrane District)
Carmichael Lake (Sudbury District)
Carnahan Lake
Carney Lake
Carnilac Lake
Caro Lake
Carol Lake
Caroline Lake
Caron Lake (Kenora District)
Caron Lake (Thunder Bay District)
Carp Lake (Algoma District)
Carp Lake (Kawartha Lakes)
Carp Lake (Rainy River District)
Carpenter Lake (Nipissing District)
Carpenter Lake (Kenora District)
Carpenter Lake (Morin Township, Algoma District)
Carpenter Lake (Tronsen Township, Algoma District)
Carpet Lake
Carre Lake
Carrick Lake
Carrie Lake
Carriere Lake
Carrigan Lake
Carrington Lake
Carroll Lake (Kenora District)
Carroll Lake (Lennox and Addington County)
Carrot Lake
Carruthers Lake
Carry Lake
Carrying Lake
Carscallen Lake
Carson Lake (Bruce County)
Carson Lake (Algoma District)
Carson Lake (Thunder Bay District)
Carson Lake (Renfrew County)
Carson Lake (Hastings County)
Carson Lake (Parry Sound District)
Carstens Lake
Carswell Lake
Cart Lake
Cartan Lake
Carter Lake (Renfrew County)
Carter Lake (Parry Sound District)
Carter Lake (Manitoulin District)
Carter Lake (Algoma District)
Carter Lake (Kenora District)
Cartier Lake (Sudbury District)
Cartier Lake (Renfrew County)
Carty Lake
Carver Lake
Cascade Lake (Lamport Township, Thunder Bay District)
Cascade Lake (Cascade River, Thunder Bay District)
Cascaden Lake
Cascanette Lake
Casey Lake (Nipissing District)
Casey Lake (Ottawa)
Casgrain Lake
Cashel Lake (Hastings County)
Cashel Lake (Nipissing District)
Cashen Lake (Parry Sound District)
Cashen Lake (Algoma District)
Casino Lake
Cask Lake
Caskill Lake
Casper Lake
Casque Lake
Cass Lake
Cassadaga Lake
Casselman's Lake
Cassels Lake
Cassidy Lake (Muskoka District)
Cassidy Lake (Algoma District)
Casson Lake
Castellar Lake
Castle Lake (Castle Creek, Thunder Bay District)
Castle Lake (Hardwick Township, Thunder Bay District)
Castlebar Lake
Castleman Lake
Castlewood Lake
Castor Lake (Eldorado Creek, Kenora District)
Castor Lake (Eyapamikama Lake (Kenora District)
Castor Lake (Nipissing District)
Castor Lake (Thunder Bay District)
Castor Ponds
Castoroil Lake
Castra Lake
Casummit Lake
Caswell Lake (Greater Sudbury)
Caswell Lake (Sudbury District)
Caswell Lake (Timiskaming District)
Cat Lake (Nipissing District)
Cat Lake (Roosevelt Township, Sudbury District)
Cat Lake (Parry Sound District)
Cat Lake (Algoma District)
Cat Lake (Umbach Township, Kenora District)
Cat Lake (Haliburton County)
Cat Lake (Cavell Township, Sudbury District)
Cat Lake (Cat River, Kenora District)
Cat Lake (Killarney)
Cataract Lake
Catastrophe Lake
Catawba Lake
Catchacoma Lake
Catcher Lake
Caterpillar Lake (Kenora District)
Caterpillar Lake (Rainy River District)
Catfish Lake (Nipissing District)
Catfish Lake (Algoma District)
Catfish Lake (Parry Sound District)
Catharine Lake
Catherine Lake (Thunder Bay District)
Catherine Lake (Kenora District)
Cathrine Lake
Cathro Lake
Cathy's Lake
Catlonite Lake
Cattral Lake
Cauchon Lake
Caufield Lake
Cauley Lake
Cauliflower Lake
Caulkin Lake
Caution Lake
Cavalary Lake
Cavanagh Lake
Cavano Lake
Cave Lake (Manitoulin District)
Cave Lake (Sudbury District)
Cavell Lake (Thunder Bay District)
Cavell Lake (Sudbury District)
Cavendish Lake
Cavern Lake
Cavers Lake (Yesno Township, Thunder Bay District)
Cavers Lake (Cavers Creek, Thunder Bay District)
Caviar Lake
Cawanogami Lake
Cawdron Lake
Cawing Lake
Cawston Lakes
Caya's Lake
Cayer Lake
Caysee Lake
Cayuga Lake

Ce
Cebush Lake
Lake Cecebe
Cecil Lake (Kenora District)
Cecil Lake (Haliburton County)
Cecil Lake (Thunder Bay District)
Cecil Lake (Timiskaming District)
Cecil Lake (Rainy River District)
Cecile Lake (Invergarry Township, Sudbury District)
Cecile Lake (McNaught Township, Sudbury District)
Cecile Lake (Thunder Bay District)
Cedar Lake (Loughborough Township, South Frontenac)
Cedar Lake (Algoma District)
Cedar Lake (Pittsburgh Township, South Frontenac)
Cedar Lake (Manitoulin District)
Cedar Lake (Brothers Township, Thunder Bay District)
Cedar Lake (Nipissing District)
Cedar Lake (Haliburton County)
Cedar Lake (Barrie Township, North Frontenac)
Cedar Lake (Greenstone)
Cedar Lake (Michipicoten Island, Thunder Bay District)
Cedar Lake (South Canonto Township, North Frontenac)
Cedar Lake (Sudbury District)
Cedar Lake (Hastings County)
Cedar Lake (Central Frontenac)
Cedar Lake (Tuuri Township, Thunder Bay District)
Cedar Lake (Kenora District)
Cedar Lake (Renfrew County)
Cedar Lake (Rainy River District)
Cedar Lakes
Cedarbough Lake
Cedarclump Lake
Cedargum Lake
Cedarlimb Lake
Cedarskirt Lake
Cedartree Lake
Cedric Lake (Thunder Bay District)
Cedric Lake (Sudbury District)
Ceepee Lake
Celastrus Lake
Cellist Lake
Celt Lake
Celtis Lake
Cemetery Lake (Sudbury District)
Cemetery Lake (Kenora District)
Centennial Lake (Renfrew County)
Centennial Lake (Algoma District)
Center Lake
Central Lake
Centralis Lake
Centre Lake (Algoma District)
Centre Lake (Stobie Township, Sudbury District)
Centre Lake (Leeds and Grenville United Counties)
Centre Lake (Thunder Bay District)
Centre Lake (Abbey Township, Sudbury District)
Centre Lake (Renfrew County)
Centre Lake (Haliburton County)
Centre Triple Lake
Centrefire Lake
Centreville Pond
Ceph Lake
Ceres Lake
Cerulean Lake
Cerullo Lake

Ch
Chabbie Lake
Chabot Lake
Chadwick Lake
Chagma Lake
Chagnon Lake
Chaillon Lake
Chain Lake (Killarney)
Chain Lake (Yeo Township, Sudbury District)
Chain Lake (Muskoka District)
Chain Lake (Algoma District)
Chain Lakes (Norberg Township, Algoma District)
Chain Lakes (White River)
Chain Lakes (Thunder Bay District)
Chain Lakes (Parry Sound District)
Chain Lakes (Frontenac County)
Chain Lakes (Hastings County)
Chain of Lakes (Sudbury District)
Chain of Lakes (Thunder Bay District)
Chainy Lake
Chair Lake
Chalet Lake
Chalice Lake
Chalk Lake
Challener Lake
Challis Lake
Chalmers Lake
Chamandy Lake
Chamber Lake
Chamberlain Lake
Chambers Lake (Sudbury District)
Chambers Lake (Nipissing District)
Chambers Lake (Thunder Bay District)
Chambers Lake (Frontenac County)
Champagne Lake
Champlain Trail Lakes
Chance Lake (Timiskaming District)
Chance Lake (Thunder Bay District)
Chancellor Lake
Chandos Lake
Change Lake
Chanley Lake
Channel Lake
Channel Lakes
Channing Lake
Chant Plain Lake
Chapeskis Lake
Chapleau Lake
Chaplin Lake
Chapman Lake (Thunder Bay District)
Chapman Lake (Cochrane District)
Chappais Lake
Chappelle Lake
Chappie Lake
Chappy Lake
Chara Lake
Charcoal Lake (Haliburton County)
Charcoal Lake (Sudbury District)
Charette Lake
Charity Lake (Thunder Bay District)
Charity Lake (Timiskaming District)
Charland Lake
Charlebois Lake (Renfrew County)
Charlebois Lake (Cochrane District)
Charles Lake (Frontenac County)
Charles Lake (Nipissing District)
Charles Lake (Haliburton County)
Charles Lake (Sudbury District)
Charleston Lake
Charlewood Lake
Charley Lake (Nipissing District)
Charley Lake (Algoma District)
Charlie Lake (Nipissing District)
Charlie Lake (Elliot Lake)
Charlie Lake (Renfrew County)
Charlie Lake (Peever Township, Algoma District)
Charlie May's Lake
Charlie's Lake
Charlies Lake (Frontenac County)
Charlies Lake (Algoma District)
Charlotte Lake (Renfrew County)
Charlotte Lake (Algoma District)
Charlotte Lake (Timiskaming District)
Charlotte Lake (Thunder Bay District)
Charlton Lake (Curtin Township, Sudbury District)
Charlton Lake (Windego Township, Sudbury District)
Charnock Lake
Charon Lake
Charr Lake
Charred Lake
Charron Lake
Chartier Lake
Chartrand Lake (Algoma District)
Chartrand Lake (Sudbury District)
Chartrand Lake (Cochrane District)
Chartrand Lake (Kenora District)
Chas Lake
Chase Lake (Rainy River District)
Chase Lake (Kenora District)
Chat Lake
Chateau Lake
Chatham Lake
Chathams Lake
Chats Lake (Lac des Chats)
Chatson Lake
Chattahoochee Lake
Chattersons Pond
Chatterton Lake
Chaucer Lake
Chaulk Lake
Chaval Lake
Chaya Pond
Chebogomog Lake
Chebucto Lake
Checklin Lake
Checkmark Lake
Cheddar Lake
Cheer Lake
Cheesehead Lake
Cheeseman Lake
Chela Lake
Chellew Lake
Chelsea Lake
Chemong Lake
Chemung Lake
Chene Lake
Cheney Lake (Algoma District)
Cheney Lake (Lanark County)
Chenier Lake
Chepahyee Sahkaheekahn/Onepine Lake
Chequer Lake
Cherniuk Lake
Cherrington Lake
Cherry Lake (Peterborough County)
Cherry Lake (Algoma District)
Cherry Lake (Kenora District)
Cherry Lake (Cochrane District)
Cherry Lake (Rainy River District)
Chesakan Lake
Chesley Lake
Chester Lake
Chevalier Lake
Chewink Lake (Nipissing District)
Chewink Lake (Sudbury District)
Chiah Lake
Chibiabos Lake
Chiblow Lake
Chicault Lake
Chick Lake (Nipissing District)
Chick Lake (Umbel Lake, Kenora District)
Chick Lake (Sellen Lake, Kenora District)
Chickadee Lake (Thunder Bay District)
Chickadee Lake (Sudbury District)
Chickaree Lake
Chicken Farm Lake
Chicobi Lake
Chicot Lake
Chief Lake (Thunder Bay District)
Chief Lake (Timiskaming District)
Chief Lake (Sudbury District)
Chief Peter Lake
Chief Tonene Lake
Chiki Lake
Chilcott Lake
Childerhose Lake
Chill Lake
Chilton Lake
Chime Lake
Chin Lake (Cochrane District)
Chin Lake (Algoma District)
China Lake
Chiniguchi Lake
Chip Lake (Algoma District)
Chip Lake (Hastings County)
Chipai Lake
Chipchase Lake
Chipman Lake (Thunder Bay District)
Chipman Lake (Algoma District)
Chipmunk Lake (Kenora District)
Chipmunk Lake (Nipissing District)
Chipmunk Lake (Thunder Bay District)
Chippego Lake
Chippy Lake
Chiroptera Lake
Chisamore Lake
Chit Lake
Chivelston Lake
Chlorus Lake
Chokecherry Lake
Chokio Lake
Cholette Lake
Chopin Lake
Chopper Lake
Chord Lake
Chorus Lake
Chota Lake
Chouinard Lake
Chowder Lake
Chown Lake
Chris Lake
Chris Willis Lake
Chriselle Lake
Christianson Lake
Christie Lake (Frontenac County)
Christie Lake (Algoma District)
Christie Lake (Lanark County)
Christie Lake (Thunder Bay District)
Christie Lake (Parry Sound District)
Christie Lake (Nipissing District)
Christie Lake (Cochrane District)
Christie Reservoir
Christina Lake
Christman Lake
Christmas Lake
Christopher Robin Lake
Christy Lake
Chrome Lake
Chrysler Lake
Chub Lake (Lake of Bays)
Chub Lake (Huntsville)
Chub Lake (Jarvis Township, Algoma District)
Chub Lake (Rainy River District)
Chub Lake (Gould Township, Algoma District)
Chubb Lake (Hastings County)
Chubb Lake (Algoma District)
Chuck Lake
Chuggin Lake
Chummy Lake
Church Lake (Timiskaming District)
Church Lake (Squeers Lake, Thunder Bay District)
Church Lake (Peterborough County)
Church Lake (Church Township, Thunder Bay District)
Church Lake (Algoma District)
Church Lake (Kenora District)
Churchill Lake
Chute Lake

Ci
Cibber Lake
Cigar Lake (Cochrane District)
Cigar Lake (Thunder Bay District)
Cinder Lake (Algoma District)
Cinder Lake (Haliburton County)
Cinder Lake (Thunder Bay District)
Cinderella Lake
Cinders Lake
Cinqisle Lake
Circle Lake (Parry Sound District)
Circle Lake (Nipissing District)
Circle Lake (Thunder Bay District)
Circle Lake (Sudbury District)
Circle Lake (Cochrane District)
Circlet Lake
Circular Lake
Cirrus Lake (Rainy River District)
Cirrus Lake (Thunder Bay District)
Citellus Lake

Cl
Clace Lake
Claim Lake (Sudbury District)
Claim Lake (Algoma District)
Clair Lake (Waterloo Region)
Clair Lake (Rainy River District)
Claire Lake (Algoma District)
Claire Lake (Cochrane District)
Claire Lake (Thunder Bay District)
Claireville Reservoir
Clam Lake (Parry Sound District)
Clam Lake (Chester Township, Sudbury District)
Clam Lake (Burwash Township, Sudbury District)
Clam Lake (Bruce County)
Clam Ponds
Clamp Lake
Clamshell Lake (Kenora District)
Clamshell Lake (Nipissing District)
Clancy Lake
Clanricarde Lake
Clapper Lake
Clara Belle Lake
Clara Lake (Nipissing District)
Clara Lake (Renfrew County)
Clara Lake (Algoma District)
Claradeer Lake
Clare Lake
Claribel Lake
Clarice Lake
Clarinet Lake
Clarity Lake
Clark Lake (Cochrane District)
Clark Lake (Muskoka District)
Clark Lake (Sudbury District)
Clark Lake (Hastings County)
Clark Pond
Clarke Lake (Timiskaming District)
Clarke Lake (Nipissing District)
Clarke Lake (Sudbury District)
Clarke's Lake
Clarkson Lake (Sudbury District)
Clarkson Lake (Kenora District)
Claude Lake
Claus Lake (Sudbury District)
Claus Lake (Thunder Bay District)
Clavelle Lake
Claw Lake (Cochrane District)
Claw Lake (Singing River, Thunder Bay District)
Claw Lake (Claw Creek, Thunder Bay District)
Claw Lake (Sudbury District)
Claw Lake (Kenora District)
Clay Lake (Algoma District)
Clay Lake (Greenwood River, Thunder Bay District)
Clay Lake (Kenora District)
Clay Lake (Atikameg Township, Thunder Bay District)
Clay Lake (Lanark County)
Clay Lake (Cochrane District)
Clay Lake (GTP Block 6 Township, Thunder Bay District)
Clay Lake (Flood Township, Thunder Bay District)
Claypack Lake
Clayton Lake (Rainy River District)
Clayton Lake (Algoma District)
Clayton Lake (Haliburton County)
Clayton Lake (Lanark County)
Clayton Lake (Timiskaming District)
Clean Lake
Clear Lake (Muskoka Lakes)
Clear Lake (Ritchie Township, Cochrane District)
Clear Lake (Bruce County)
Clear Lake (Frontenac County)
Clear Lake (Thunder Bay District)
Clear Lake (Laurentian Hills)
Clear Lake (Espanola)
Clear Lake (Spanish)
Clear Lake (Leeds and Grenville United Counties)
Clear Lake (Wilson Township, Parry Sound District)
Clear Lake (Algonquin Highlands)
Clear Lake (Nansen Township, Cochrane District)
Clear Lake (McKellar)
Clear Lake (O'Brien Township, Cochrane District))
Clear Lake (Bayly Township, Timiskaming District)
Clear Lake (Laurentian Valley)
Clear Lake (Minden Hills)
Clear Lake (Perry)
Clear Lake (Hess Township, Sudbury District)
Clear Lake (Lac Seul 28)
Clear Lake (Coleman)
Clear Lake (Timmins)
Clear Lake (The Archipelago)
Clear Lake (Bracebridge)
Clear Lake (Huron Shores)
Clear Lake (Axe River, Kenora District)
Clear Lake (Tay Valley)
Clear Lake (Lanark Highlands)
Clear Lake (Greater Sudbury)
Clear Lake (Big Canon Lake, Kenora District)
Clear Lake (Peterborough County)
Clear Lake (Kawartha Lakes)
Clear Lake (East Mills Township, Parry Sound District)
Clear Lake (Foley Township, Seguin)
Clear Lake (Patterson Township, Parry Sound District)
Clear Lake (Nipissing District)
Clear Lake (Oslo Lake, Kenora District)
Clear Lake (Burton Township, Whitestone)
Clear Lake (Hagerman Township, Whitestone)
Clear Lake (Nettleton Township, Cochrane District)
Clear Lake (Kirkup Township, Kenora District)
Clear Lake (Killarney)
Clear Lake (Humphrey Township, Seguin)
Clear Lakes
Clearall Lake
Clearaqua Lake
Clearbed Lake
Clearsilver Lake
Clearview Lake (Nipissing District)
Clearview Lake (Algoma District)
Clearwater Lake (Badwater Creek, Thunder Bay District)
Clearwater Lake (Kenora District)
Clearwater Lake (Timiskaming District)
Clearwater Lake (Common Township, Algoma District)
Clearwater Lake (Gravenhurst)
Clearwater Lake (Frontenac County)
Clearwater Lake (Nipissing District)
Clearwater Lake (Huntsville)
Clearwater Lake (Cochrane District)
Clearwater Lake (Sudbury District)
Clearwater Lake (Laberge Township, Thunder Bay District)
Clearwater Lake (GTP Block 2 Township, Thunder Bay District)
Clearwater Lake (Jarvis Township, Algoma District)
Clearwater Pond
Clearwater West Lake
Cleary Lake
Cleaver Lake (Timiskaming District)
Cleaver Lake (Thunder Bay District)
Cleftrock Lake
Clegge Lake
Cleland Lake
Clem Lake
Clement Lake (Sudbury District)
Clement Lake (Haliburton County)
Clement Lake (Renfrew County)
Clement Lake (Rainy River District)
Clements Lake
Clemmens Lake
Clemow Lake
Clerc Lake
Clermont Lake
Cleveland Lake (Kenora District)
Cleveland Lake (Sudbury District)
Clevis Lake
Cliff Lake (Corbriere Township, Algoma District)
Cliff Lake (Renfrew County)
Cliff Lake (Pettypiece Township, Kenora District)
Cliff Lake (Nipissing District)
Cliff Lake (McGaw Creek, Thunder Bay District)
Cliff Lake (Pikitigushi River, Thunder Bay District)
Cliff Lake (Mystery Lake, Kenora District)
Cliff Lake (Lane Township, Algoma District)
Clifford Lake
Cliffside Lake
Clifftay Lake
Clifton Lake
Cline Lake
Clinto Lake
Clist Lake
Clod Lake
Clodan Lake
Cloister Lake
Closs Lake (Algoma District)
Closs Lake (Kenora District)
Closs Lake (Renfrew County)
Cloud Lake (Jay Creek, Thunder Bay District)
Cloud Lake (Neebing)
Cloud Lake (Nipissing District)
Cloudlet Lake
Cloudy Lake (Renfrew County)
Cloudy Lake (Algoma District)
Cloudy Lake (Peterborough County)
Clouston Lake
Clouthier Lake
Cloutier Lake (Cochrane District)
Cloutier Lake (Thunder Bay District)
Clove Lake (Algoma District)
Clove Lake (Thunder Bay District)
Cloven Lake
Clovenhoof Lake
Clover Lake (Greenstone)
Clover Lake (Nipissing District)
Clover Lake (Esnagami Township, Thunder Bay District)
Cloverleaf Lake
Clow Lake
Club House Pond
Club Lake (Frontenac County)
Club Lake (Thunder Bay District)
Club Lake (Algoma District)
Club Lake (Nipissing District)
Clubbe Lake
Clubhouse Lake
Cluderay Lake
Cluff Lake
Cluster Lakes
Clute Lake
Clutes Lake
Clyde Lake (Lanark County)
Clyde Lake (Haliburton County)
Clydegale Lake
Clydesdale Lake

Co
Coag Lake
Coat Lake
Coate Lake
Coates Lake
Coathup Lake
Cob Lake
Cobalt Lake
Cobb Lake
Cobbett Lake
Cobble Lake
Cobham Lake
Cobley Lake
Cobourg Lake
Cobre Lake
Coburn Lake (Kawartha Lakes)
Coburn Lake (Kenora District)
Cochalgo Lake
Cochenour Lake
Cochram Lake
Cochrane Lake (Sudbury District)
Cochrane Lake (Cochrane District)
Cochrane Lake (Parry Sound District)
Cockaday Lake
Cockburn Lake (Nipissing District)
Cockburn Lake (Timiskaming District)
Cockin Lake
Cockle Lake
Cocoa Lake
Cocos Lake
Cod Lake
Code Lake
Coe (Island) Lake
Coe Lake
Coffee Lake (Algoma District)
Coffee Lake (Wilson Island, Thunder Bay District)
Coffee Lake (Nipissing District)
Coffee Lake (Carib Creek, Thunder Bay District)
Coffey Lake (Hastings County)
Coffey Lake (Thunder Bay District)
Coghlan Lake
Cognashene Lake
Coin Lake (Lanark County)
Coin Lake (Kenora District)
Cola Lake
Colborne Lake
Colbourne Lake
Colbran Lake
Colby Lake
Cold Lake (Peterborough County)
Cold Lake (Rainy River District)
Coldingham Lake
Coldrey Lake
Coldspring Lake
Coldwater Lake (Michipicoten Island, Thunder Bay District)
Coldwater Lake (Wardrope Township, Thunder Bay District)
Coldwater Lake (Muskoka District)
Coldwind Lake
Cole Lake (Frontenac County)
Cole Lake (Sioux Narrows-Nestor Falls)
Cole Lake (Carling)
Cole Lake (Blair Township, Parry Sound District)
Cole Lake (MacFie Township, Kenora District)
Cole Lake (Rainy River District)
Cole Lake (Cochrane District)
Cole Lake (Timiskaming District)
Coleman Lake (Fox Township, Cochrane District)
Coleman Lake (Thunder Bay District)
Coleman Lake (Kenora District)
Coleman Lake (Haliburton County)
Coleman Lake (Timiskaming District)
Coleman Lake (Mewhinney Township, Cochrane District)
Colenso Lake
Coles Lake
Colette Lake
Colfe Lake
Colgrove Lake
Coli Lake
Colin Lake (Rainy River District)
Colin Lake (Renfrew County)
Colin Lake (Sudbury District)
Colin Scott Lake
Collacutt Lake
Collaton Lake
Colleen Lake (Thunder Bay District)
Colleen Lake (Sudbury District)
Collin Lake
Collinge Lake
Collins Lake (Renfrew County)
Collins Lake (Frontenac County)
Collins Lake (Nipissing District)
Collins Lake (Timiskaming District)
Collins Lake (Thunder Bay District)
Collins Lake (Cochrane District)
Collis Lake
Collishaw Lake
Collver Lake
Colonel By Lake
Colonna Lake
Colpitts Lake
Colter Lake
Colton Lake (Admaston/Bromley)
Colton Lake (Laurentian Hills)
Coltson Lake
Columbia Lake
Columbus Lake (Cochrane District)
Columbus Lake (Timiskaming District)
Colvin Lake
Colwill Lake
Combe Lake
Comma Lake
Command Lake
Commanda Lake
Commando Lake (Sudbury District)
Commando Lake (Cochrane District)
Commodore Lake
Como Lake (Rainy River District)
Como Lake (Bazett Township, Sudbury District)
Como Lake (Strathearn Township, Sudbury District)
Comox Lake
Companion Lakes
Compass Lake (Thunder Bay District)
Compass Lake (Parry Sound District)
Compass Lake (Timiskaming District)
Compass Lake (Peterborough County)
Compass Lakes
Complin Lake
Con Lake
Conacher Lake
Conant Lake
Conboy Lake
Conboys Lake
Concession Lake (Cardwell Township, Muskoka Lakes)
Concession Lake (Peterborough County)
Concession Lake (Medora Township, Muskoka Lakes)
Concord Lake
Cond Lake
Condon Lake
Cone Lake (Kenora District)
Cone Lake (Rainy River District)
Conestogo Lake
Confederation Lake
Confusion Lake
Conger Lake
Conglomerate Lake (Timiskaming District)
Conglomerate Lake (Thunder Bay District)
Conick Lake
Conifer Lake
Conk Lake
Conklin Lake
Conley Lake (Algoma District)
Conley Lake (Bruce County)
Conlin Lake
Conlon Lake
Conmee Lake
Connaught Lake
Connecting Lake
Connell Lake
Connell's Lake
Connells Lake
Connelly Lake
Connett Lake
Connon Lake
Connor Lake (Renfrew County)
Connor Lake (Thunder Bay District)
Connor Lake (Hastings County)
Connors Lake (Lennox and Addington County)
Connors Lake (Lanark County)
Conolly Lake
Conover Lake
Conross Lake
Consecon Lake
Constance Lake (Cochrane District)
Constance Lake (Algoma District)
Constance Lake (Ottawa)
Constance Lake (Timiskaming District)
Constant Lake
Contact Lake (Timiskaming District)
Contact Lake (Kenora District)
Contact Lake (Nipissing District)
Contau Lake
Conte Lake
Contin Lake
Conver Lake
Convey Lake
Conway Lake (Renfrew County)
Conway Lake (Algoma District)
Cony Lake
Cooch Lake
Cook Lake (English River, Kenora District)
Cook Lake (Frontenac County)
Cook Lake (Cochrane District)
Cook Lake (McNaughton Township, Kenora District)
Cook Lake (Thunder Bay District)
Cook Lake (Britton Township, Kenora District)
Cook Pond
Cook's Lake
Cooke Lake (Timiskaming District)
Cooke Lake (Nipissing District)
Cooke Lake (Sudbury District)
Cookery Lake
Cooley Pond
Coollas Lake
Coombs Lake
Coomer Lake
Cooney Lake (Kawartha Lakes)
Cooney Lake (Thunder Bay District)
Coonie Lake
Coons Lake
Coop Lake
Cooper Lake (Oscar Township, Algoma District)
Cooper Lake (Muskoka District)
Cooper Lake (Haughton Township, Algoma District)
Cooper Lake (Parry Sound District)
Cooper Lake (Nipissing District)
Coot Lake (Sudbury District)
Coot Lake (Nipissing District)
Coot Lake (Cochrane District)
Cootie Lake
Cop Lake (Timiskaming District)
Cop Lake (Nipissing District)
Cope Lake
Copeland Lake
Copenhagen Lake
Copeway Lake
Copilot Lake
Copp Lake
Coppell Lake
Coppens Lake
Copper Lake (Haliburton County)
Copper Lake (Peterborough County)
Copper Lake (Hastings County)
Copper Lake (Timiskaming District)
Copperfield Lake
Coppersand Lake
Copping Lake
Copps Lake (Grey County)
Copps Lake (Nipissing District)
Coral Lake
Coral-root Lake
Corallen Lake
Corbeau Lake
Corben Lake
Corbett Lake (Haliburton County)
Corbett Lake (Kenora District)
Corbier Lake
Corbiere Lake
Corby Lake
Cord Lake
Cordes Lake
Cordick Lake
Cordingley Lake
Cordner Lake
Cordova Lake
Core Lake (Thunder Bay District)
Core Lake (Kenora District)
Coreaux Lake
Corfe Lake
Corine Lake
Cork Lake (Scriven Township, Sudbury District)
Cork Lake (Thunder Bay District)
Cork Lake (Sothman Township, Sudbury District)
Cork Lake (Nipissing District)
Corkery Lake
Corking Lake
Corkscrew Lake
Corless Lake
Cormick Lake
Corn Lake (Sioux Narrows-Nestor Falls)
Corn Lake (Redditt Township, Kenora District)
Cornall Lake
Corncob Lake
Cornelius Lake
Cornell Lake (Kenora District)
Cornell Lake (Big Turtle River, Rainy River District)
Cornell Lake (Cornell Creek, Rainy River District)
Corner Lake (Mercutio River, Thunder Bay District)
Corner Lake (Docker Township, Kenora District)
Corner Lake (Jackman Township, Kenora District)
Corner Lake (Asselin Township, Algoma District)
Corner Lake (Gaiashk Township, Algoma District)
Corner Lake (Beaton Township, Algoma District)
Corner Lake (Greenstone)
Corner Lake (Timiskaming District)
Corner Lakes
Cornerstone Lake
Cornet Lake
Cornfield Lake
Cornice Lake
Cornick Lake
Cornish Lake (Thunder Bay District)
Cornish Lake (Parry Sound District)
Coronary Lake
Coronation Lake
Corr Lake
Corre Lake
Correll Lake
Corri Lake
Corrie Lake (Milfair Lake, Kenora District)
Corrie Lake (Shinbone Lake, Kenora District)
Corrigan Lake (Sudbury District)
Corrigan Lake (Thunder Bay District)
Corrigan Lake (Kenora District)
Corry Lake
Corset Lake (Sudbury District)
Corset Lake (Timiskaming District)
Corsica Lake
Corson Lake
Cortez Lake
Corvec Lake
Corylus Lake
Cosens Lake (Thunder Bay District)
Cosens Lake (Sudbury District)
Cosgrave Lake
Cosgrove Lake
Cosh Lake
Cosmo Lake
Costello Lake (Sudbury District)
Costello Lake (Kenora District)
Costello Lake (Nipissing District)
Costello Lake (Timiskaming District)
Côté Lake (Sudbury District)
Côté Lake (Kenora District)
Cotoneaster Lake
Cotter Lake (Muskoka District)
Cotter Lake (Cochrane District)
Cotters Lake
Cottle Lake
Cotton Lake
Cottontail Lake
Coubran Lake
Couchain Lake
Coucheemoskog Lake
Lake Couchiching
Coughlan Lake
Coulas Lake
Coull Lake
Coulson Lake (Cochrane District)
Coulson Lake (Rainy River District)
Coulter Lake
Council Lake
Countess Lake
Couple Lake
Courchesne's Lake
Course Lake
Court Lake
Courtis Lake
Courtney Lake
Coutch Lake
Coutts Lake
Couture Lake (Kenora District)
Couture Lake (Thunder Bay District)
Coveney Lake
Coveo Lake
Cover Lake
Covey Lake
Coville Lake
Cow Lake (Haliburton County)
Cow Lake (Greater Sudbury)
Cow Lake (Timiskaming District)
Cow Lake (Kenora District)
Cow Lake (Sudbury District)
Cow-in-Lake
Cowamula Lake
Cowan Lake (Muskoka District)
Cowan Lake (Southern Lake, Thunder Bay District)
Cowan Lake (Cowan Creek, Thunder Bay District)
Cowan's Lake
Cowboy Lake
Cowichan Lake
Cowie Lake (Algoma District)
Cowie Lake (Timiskaming District)
Cowles Lake
Cowman Lake
Cox Lake (Algoma District)
Cox Lake (Thunder Bay District)
Cox Lake (Keys Lake, Kenora District)
Cox Lake (Mennin River, Kenora District)
Cox Lake (Peterborough County)
Cox's Lake
Coy Lake
Coyle Lake (Lanark County)
Coyle Lake (Thunder Bay District)
Coyne Lake (Sudbury District)
Coyne Lake (Thunder Bay District)
Coyston Lake

Cr
Crab Lake (Spanish)
Crab Lake (Quill Township, Algoma District)
Crab Lake (Peterborough County)
Crab Lake (Sudbury District)
Crabclaw Lake
Crabtree Lake (Thunder Bay District)
Crabtree Lake (Sudbury District)
Cracknell Lake
Crackshot Lake
Craddock Lake
Cradle Lake
Cradle Lakes
Craft Lake (Head Creek, Thunder Bay District)
Craft Lake (Schreiber)
Crag Lake (Thunder Bay District)
Crag Lake (Frontenac County)
Craig Lake (Algoma District)
Craig Lake (Thunder Bay District)
Craig Lake (Nipissing District)
Craig Lake (Rainy River District)
Craig Lake (Lanark County)
Craignaivie Lake
Crain Lake
Crains Lake
Cramadog Lake
Cramp Lake (Thunder Bay District)
Cramp Lake (Kenora District)
Cranberry Creek Lake
Cranberry Lake (Digby Township, Kawartha Lakes)
Cranberry Lake (Carden Township, Kawartha Lakes)
Cranberry Lake (Head, Clara and Maria)
Cranberry Lake (South Canonto Township, North Frontenac)
Cranberry Lake (Central Frontenac)
Cranberry Lake (East Mills Township, Parry Sound District)
Cranberry Lake (Whitefish Lake 6)
Cranberry Lake (Hastings County)
Cranberry Lake (Haliburton County)
Cranberry Lake (Severn)
Cranberry Lake (Lanark County)
Cranberry Lake (Palmerston Township, North Frontenac)
Cranberry Lake (Sutherland Township, Rainy River District)
Cranberry Lake (The Archipelago)
Cranberry Lake (Pittsburgh Township, South Frontenac)
Cranberry Lake (Burwash Township, Sudbury District)
Cranberry Lake (Portland Township, South Frontenac)
Cranberry Lake (Pear Lake, Rainy River District)
Cranberry Lake (Collingwood)
Cranberry Lake (Madawaska Valley)
Cranberry Lake (Leeds and Grenville United Counties)
Cranberry Lake (McDougall)
Cranberry Lake (Dalton Township, Kawartha Lakes)
Cranberry Lake (Kenora District)
Cranberry Lake (Algoma District)
Crane Lake (Bruce County)
Crane Lake (Cochrane District)
Crane Lake (Timiskaming District)
Crane Lake (Parry Sound District)
Crane Lake (Kenora District)
Crane Lake (Peterborough County)
Cranebill Lake
Cranesnest Lake
Cranjelly Lake
Crankshaw Lake
Crash Lake
Crater Lake
Crater Lakes
Crates Lake
Craven Lake
Crawfish Lake (Duff Township, Cochrane District)
Crawfish Lake (Gurney Township, Cochrane District)
Crawford Lake (Halton Region)
Crawford Lake (Haultain, Timiskaming District)
Crawford Lake (Rainy River District)
Crawford Lake (Parry Sound District)
Crawford Lake (Cochrane District)
Crawford Lake (Sudbury District)
Crawford Lake (Milner Township, Timiskaming District)
Cray Lake
Crayfish Lake (Thunder Bay District)
Crayfish Lake (Algoma District)
Crayon Lake
Crazy Lake (Algoma District)
Crazy Lake (Venturi Township, Sudbury District)
Crazy Lake (Admiral Township, Sudbury District)
Cream Lake (Algoma District)
Cream Lake (Muskoka District)
Creamer Lake
Creasy Lake
Creation Lake
Cree Lake (Sudbury District)
Cree Lake (Algoma District)
Cree Lake (Cochrane District)
Creed Lake
Creede Lake
Creek's End Lake
Creeping Lake
Creepy Lake
Crego Lake
Creighton Lake
Creppy Lake
Crerar Lake
Crescent Lake (Algoma District)
Crescent Lake (Zigzag Lake, Thunder Bay District)
Crescent Lake (Sudbury District)
Crescent Lake (Fort William 52)
Crescent Lake (Nipissing District)
Crescent Lake (Kenora District)
Crescent Lake (Mackie Lake, Thunder Bay District)
Crescent Lake (Oboshkegan Township, Thunder Bay District)
Crescent Lake (Cochrane District)
Cressey Lake
Cressview Lakes
Cressy Lake
Crest Lake (Nipissing District)
Crest Lake (Thunder Bay District)
Crest Lake (Cochrane District)
Creswicke Lake
Crevasse Lake
Crevice Lake
Crew Lake
Crib Lake (Frontenac County)
Crib Lake (Thunder Bay District)
Crickard Lake
Cripple Lake (Nipissing District)
Cripple Lake (Timiskaming District)
Cripple Lakes
Crispin Lake
Cristal Lake
Cristene Lake
Critchell Lake
Croal Lake
Croasdell Lake
Crocan Lake
Crock Lake
Crockatt Lake
Crocker's Lake
Croesus Lake
Croft Lake
Croker Lake
Croll Lake (Algoma District)
Croll Lake (Thunder Bay District)
Cromarty Lake
Crombie Lake
Cronin Lake
Cronk Lake
Crony Lake
Crook Lake
Crooked Cane Lake
Crooked Chute Lake
Crooked Green Lake
Crooked Lake (Frontenac County)
Crooked Lake (Laurentian Valley)
Crooked Lake (Kearney)
Crooked Lake (Kawartha Lakes)
Crooked Lake (Cox Township, Sudbury District)
Crooked Lake (Burwash Township, Sudbury District)
Crooked Lake (Rainy River District)
Crooked Lake (Greater Sudbury)
Crooked Lake (Madawaska Valley)
Crooked Lake (Kenora District)
Crooked Lake (Patterson Township, Parry Sound District)
Crooked Lake (Lennox and Addington County)
Crooked Lake (Brackin Township, Sudbury District)
Crooked Lake (Nipissing District)
Crooked Lakes
Crooked Pine Lake
Crookstick Lake
Croon Lake
Crosby Lake (Timiskaming District)
Crosby Lake (Algoma District)
Crosby Lake (Leeds and Grenville United Counties)
Croshaw Lake
Croskery Lake
Crosman Lake
Cross Corner Lake
Cross Lake (Deacon Creek, Kenora District)
Cross Lake (South Algonquin)
Cross Lake (Temagami)
Cross Lake (St.-Charles)
Cross Lake (Algoma District)
Cross Lake (Curtin Township, Sudbury District)
Cross Lake (Parry Sound District)
Cross Lake (Mister Creek, Kenora District)
Crossbar Lake
Crossbill Lake
Crosscut Lake
Crossecho Lake
Crossland Lake
Crossley Lake
Crosson Lake
Crossover Lake
Crosspath Lake
Crossroute Lake
Crosstee Lake
Crosswise Lake
Crotch Lake (Algoma District)
Crotch Lake (North Frontenac)
Crotch Lake (Timiskaming District)
Crotch Lake (Nipissing District)
Crotch Lake (Central Frontenac)
Crotch Lake (Parry Sound District)
Crotch Lake (Muskoka District)
Crotchet Lake
Crotin Lake
Crouch Lake
Crow Lake (Thunder Bay District)
Crow Lake (Leeds and Grenville United Counties)
Crow Lake (McDougall)
Crow Lake (Central Frontenac–South Frontenac)
Crow Lake (Brown Township, Parry Sound District)
Crow Lake (Sudbury District)
Crow Lake (The North Shore)
Crow Lake (McEwing Township, Algoma District))
Crow Lake (Devil Lake, South Frontenac)
Crowder Lake
Crowduck Lake
Crowe Lake
Crowfoot Lake
Crowley Lake
Crown Lake (Haliburton County)
Crown Lake (Timiskaming District)
Crown Lake (Cochrane District)
Crowrock Lake
Croy Lake
Crozier Lake (Thunder Bay District)
Crozier Lake (Algoma District)
Cruelface Lake
Cruise Lake
Cruiser Lake
Crumby Lake
Crump Lake
Cruse Lake
Cruso Lake
Crutch Lake
Cry Lake
Cryderman Lake (Sudbury District)
Cryderman Lake (Kenora District)
Crystal Lake (Neebing)
Crystal Lake (Haliburton County)
Crystal Lake (Cochrane District)
Crystal Lake (Tweedle Township, Algoma District)
Crystal Lake (Rainy River District)
Crystal Lake (Machin)
Crystal Lake (Norfolk County)
Crystal Lake (Frechette Township, Sudbury District)
Crystal Lake (Crystal River, Kenora District)
Crystal Lake (Lennox and Addington County)
Crystal Lake (Antrim Township, Sudbury District)
Crystal Lake (Bayly Township, Timiskaming District)
Crystal Lake (Peterborough County)
Crystal Lake (Lebel Township, Timiskaming District)
Crystal Lake (Ambrose Lake, Thunder Bay District)
Crystal Lake (Aweres Township, Algoma District)
Crystalline Lake (Haliburton County)
Crystalline Lake (Nipissing District)

Cu–Cy
Cub Lake (Kenora District)
Cub Lake (Rainy River District)
Cub Lake (Cochrane District)
Cuckoo Lake (Cochrane District)
Cuckoo Lake (Nipissing District)
Cuckoo Lake (Sudbury District)
Cucumber Lake (Sudbury District)
Cucumber Lake (Frontenac County)
Cuddys Lake
Cul de Sac Lake
Culbert Lake
Culhanes Lake
Culin Lake
Cull Lake (Thunder Bay District)
Cull Lake (Simcoe County)
Cullen Lake (Sudbury District)
Cullen Lake (Rainy River District)
Cullin Lake
Culloden Lake
Culverson Lake
Cumaway Lake
Cumming Lake
Cumming's Lake
Cummings Lake
Cummins Lake
Cuncic Lake
Cuni Lake
Cunniah Lake
Cunningham Lake (Timiskaming District)
Cunningham Lake (Bruce County)
Cup Lake
Cupa Lake
Curie Lake
Curlew Lake (Nipissing District)
Curlew Lake (Thunder Bay District)
Curleys Lake
Curly Lake (Nipissing District)
Curly Lake (Sudbury District)
Current Lake
Currie Lake (Timiskaming District)
Currie Lake (Hastings County)
Currie Lake (Cochrane District)
Currier Lake
Curriers Lake
Curry Lake (Nadjiwon Township, Algoma District)
Curry Lake (Desbiens Township, Algoma District)
Curtis Lake (Rainy River District)
Curtis Lake (Thunder Bay District)
Curve Lake (Thunder Bay District)
Curve Lake (Kenora District)
Curve Lake (Algoma District)
Curzon Lake
Cushing Lake (Thunder Bay District)
Cushing Lake (Algoma District)
Cushing Lake (Rainy River District)
Cuss Lake
Cut Lake
Cutcliffe Lake
Cuthbert Lake (Kenora District)
Cuthbert Lake (Cochrane District)
Cuthbertson Lake
Cutler Lake
Cutstone Lake
Cuttle Lake
Cutty Lake
Cybulski Lake
Cygnet Lake
Cypress Lake (Thunder Bay District)
Cypress Lake (Algoma District)
Cyprus Lake
Cyril Lake (Cochrane District)
Cyril Lake (Knight Township, Timiskaming District)
Cyril Lake (Coleman)

References
 Geographical Names Data Base, Natural Resources Canada

C